Barmsee is a lake in Oberbayern, Bavaria, Germany. At an elevation of 885.03 m, its surface area is 55 hectares.

Lakes of Bavaria
Bavarian Prealps